The Marvel Loch Gold Mine is a gold mine located at Marvel Loch,  south of Southern Cross, Western Australia.

It is operated by St Barbara Limited. Apart from Marvel Loch, St Barbara also operated the Gwalia Gold Mine at Leonora and owned the Tarmoola Gold Mine, which was placed in care and maintenance.

All three mines were previously owned by the now defunct mining company Sons of Gwalia Limited. Sons of Gwalia went into administration on 30 August 2004 and the company's gold mining operations were sold to St Barbara in March 2005 for A$38 million, having been valued by the Sons of Gwalia directors at A$120 million. While Marvel Loch was operational before and after the sale, the Gwalia mine was already placed in care and maintenance at the time of the transaction. A fourth mine, the Carosue Dam Gold Mine, ceased operation in June 2005 and was sold by St Barbara.

The mine is owned by Barto Gold Mining but operated by Minjar Gold.

History

Mining in the area around Marvel Loch dates back to the early 1900s and between 1905 and 1986,  of gold were recorded as having been mined.

From 1979 to 1987, the mine was operated as a joint venture between Kia Ora Gold Corporation NL and Western United Limited, after which it was sold to Mawson Pacific Limited. Mawson Pacific subsequently sold the mine to Reynolds Australia Gold Operations Ltd, a wholly owned subsidiary of Reynolds US Metals. On 1 April 2005 the Marvel Loch Mine together with the Southern Cross Mill and adjacent mines was sold to Sons of Gwalia for $23m. The Yilgarn Star Joint Venture operated the Yilgarn Star Open Pit and Underground mine and mill as well as the Nevoria Gold Mine.

Sons of Gwalia mined the Marvel Loch deposit as a surface mine for the most part of the mine's history since reopening in the 1990s, upgrading its production facility in 2001. In February 2001, the company announced it consolidated its Southern Cross operations, acquiring the remaining 30% of the Yilgarn Star Gold Mine it didn't own and merging the operation with Marvel Loch, closing the Yilgarn Star mill. It also acquired other interests in the region in this transaction. Since then, production from Yilgarn has been listed under Marvel Loch.

After a rapid rise of the company, unauthorised gold and foreign exchange trading activities by chief financial officer Eardley Ross-Adjie in the year to June 2000, ended up costing Sons of Gwalia more than A$190 million. Sons of Gwalia went into administration on 30 August 2004, following a financial collapse, with debts exceeding $800 million after suffering from falling gold reserves and hedging losses. Sons of Gwalia was Australia's third-largest gold producer and also controlled more than half the world's production of tantalum.

St Barbara purchased the mine from insolvent Sons of Gwalia in March 2005.

Since the purchase of the Mine by St Barbara, mining has been carried out both in surface and underground operations. In July 2009, St Barbara suspended open pit mining at Marvel Loch and decided that the treatment plant would be operated on a week-on, week-off basis.

After placing the mine in care and maintenance in late 2012, St Barbara sold the mine for A$22.5 million in cash to Chinese company Hanking Gold Mining in January 2013. Hanking Gold eventually reopened the mine, commencing mining in August 2014 and pouring first gold in early 2015. 

Barto Gold Mining and the mine are owned by Shandong Tianye Group Bid Co Pty Ltd, which purchased Hanking Gold Mining for A$330 million in early 2017. The mine is operated by Minjar Gold.

Production
Production of the mine (including Yilgarn Star since June 2001):

Yilgarn Star

 2 January to June 2002 only.

Marvel Loch

 1 2005 results for 28 March to 30 June only.

References

Bibliography

External links 
 
 MINEDEX website: Marvel Loch - Southern Cross Database of the Department of Mines, Industry Regulation and Safety
 How sons of Lalor built, then sank, Sons of Gwalia The Sydney Morning Herald - Article on the collapse of Sons of Gwalia

Gold mines in Western Australia
Surface mines in Australia
Underground mines in Australia
Shire of Yilgarn